Billy Connolly: Journey to the Edge of the World is a four-part travel documentary series produced by ITV Studios, presented by Scottish comedian and actor Billy Connolly.

In the summer of 2008, Connolly travels from Halifax, Nova Scotia on the Canadian Atlantic coast through the notorious Northwest Passage to Vancouver Island on the Canadian Pacific coast. On the way he meets the people living there, participates in their cultures, and enjoys the nature and wildlife, as well as adding in some fun and comedy along the way.

The series started airing on ITV on 19 February 2009 and on Seven Network in Australia in April 2009. The DVD-release of all four episodes and a bonus feature was on 16 March 2009.

Episode list

See also 
 Billy Connolly's Route 66

References

External links 
 

2009 British television series debuts
2009 British television series endings
Billy Connolly
ITV documentaries
British travel television series
2000s British television miniseries
Television series by ITV Studios
English-language television shows